John Baildon (11 December 1772 – 7 August 1846) was a Scottish pioneer in metallurgy in continental Europe.

Baildon was born in Larbert, Stirlingshire. In 1793, he came to Prussian Silesia (in modern-day Upper Silesia, Poland) on the invitation of Friedrich von Reden. During the remainder of his life in Silesia, Baildon was involved in numerous pioneering industrial undertakings, including construction of the first blast furnaces fired by coke in continental Europe (in Gliwice (Gleiwitz) and Chorzów (Königshütte), the first pig iron produced on 21 September 1796), the Kanał Kłodnicki (Klodnitz Canal), and the first iron bridge in continental Europe (over the Strzegomka river in Łażany (Laasan), Lower Silesia, erected in Spring 1796).

John married Helene Antonie Galli, daughter of an Italian merchant, in Gleiwitz in 1804 and had 7 children (5 sons, 2 daughters). He died in Gleiwitz and is buried there at the Metallurgical Cemetery, known as the Cmentarz Hutniczy in Polish.

A major steel works (Baildon Steelworks, Katowice, established in 1823, liquidated in 2001) was named after him.

External links
 Szymonowicz, Jarosław "A Scotsman in Silesia" Warsaw Voice, 28 March 2007. Retrieved 18 October 2007.
 About Family Baildon-Briestwell on the website Silesian gentry and aristocracy, (English).

Scottish engineers
People from Gliwice
People from Katowice
1772 births
1846 deaths
People from Larbert
British metallurgists